John Bethune may refer to:

 John Bethune (Scottish minister) (1725–1774) Scottish minister and philosopher
 John Bethune (Canadian minister) (1751–1815), founder of the first Presbyterian Church in Montreal
 John Drinkwater Bethune (1762–1844), English army officer and military historian
 John Bethune (principal) (1791–1872), Canadian Anglican priest, and acting principal of McGill University from 1835 to 1846
 John Elliot Drinkwater Bethune (1801–1851), English barrister 
 John Bethune (poet) (1812–1839), Scottish poet
 John Lemuel Bethune (1850–1913), Canadian physician and politician
 John Bethune (footballer) (1888–1955), Scottish footballer
 John Bethune of Craigfoodie, Scottish landowner and politician, later a clergyman

See also
John of Béthune (disambiguation)